Billy Bolt (born 17 August 1997 in Wallsend, United Kingdom) is an English motorcycle rider who has won professional titles in trial, enduro and endurocross. He has won the FIM SuperEnduro World Championship twice and was the first to win the FIM Hard Enduro World Championship.

Racing career
Billy Bolt started showing interest in motorcycles from a young age, inheriting the love for the occupation from his father.

In 2018, he won the World Enduro Super Series. In 2019, he had to undergo a leg surgery.

In 2020, he won the FIM SuperEnduro World Championship for the first time, after sitting out the 2019 series due to an injury. Riding a Husqvarna, he won 7 races out of 12. 

In 2021, Billy Bolt became the first ever FIM Hard Enduro World Championship.

In 2022, he won FIM SuperEnduro World Championship second year straight (the 2021 season was cancelled due to the COVID-19 pandemic).

Honours
 FIM SuperEnduro World Championship winner:
 2020, 2022
 FIM Hard Enduro World Championship winner:
 2021
 World Enduro Super Series winner:
 2018

External links
 Page on Husqvarna-Motorcycles

References

English  motorcycle racers
Sportspeople from Wallsend
Enduro riders
1997 births
Living people